Columella (4–) was a Roman writer.

Columella, meaning little column, may also refer to:

Biology
 Columella (auditory system), a part of the auditory system of amphibians, reptiles and birds
 Columella (botany), an axis of sterile tissue which passes through the center of the spore-case of mosses and a cellular layer near the tip of a plant's root cap
 Columella (gastropod), an anatomical feature of a coiled snail or gastropod shell
 Columella (genus), a genus of land gastropods in the family Vertiginidae
 Columella (plant), a cultivar of Dutch elm
 Columella nasi, the fleshy external end of the nasal septum
 In corals, the central axis structure of a corallite formed by the inner ends of the septa

Other uses
 Columella (wine), a wine label by South African producer The Sadie Family
 Columella; or, The Distressed Anchoret, a 1779 novel by Richard Graves

See also
 Collum (disambiguation)
 Column (disambiguation)